The City of Liverpool is a local government area, administered by Liverpool City Council, located to the south-west of Sydney, in the state of New South Wales, Australia. The area encompasses  and its administrative centre is located in the suburb of Liverpool.

The Mayor of the City is Cr. Ned Mannoun, a member of the Liberal Party.

Suburbs and localities in the local government area
The following suburbs and localities are located within the City of Liverpool:

Demographics 
At the  there were  people in the Liverpool local government area, of these 49.6 per cent were male and 50.4 per cent were female. Aboriginal and Torres Strait Islander people made up 1.5 per cent of the population; significantly below the NSW and Australian averages of 2.9 and 2.8 per cent respectively. The median age of people in the City of Liverpool was 33 years; significantly lower than the national median of 38 years. Children aged 0 – 14 years made up 22.7 per cent of the population and people aged 65 years and over made up 10.4 per cent of the population. Of people in the area aged 15 years and over, 51.8 per cent were married and 11.0 per cent were either divorced or separated.

At the 2016 census, the population in the City increased by 13.24 per cent. When compared with total population growth of Australia for the same period, being 8.8 per cent, population growth in the Liverpool local government area was significantly higher than the national average. The median weekly income for residents within the City of Liverpool was lower than the national average.

At the 2016 census, the area was linguistically diverse, with a significantly higher than average proportion (57.2 per cent) where two or more languages are spoken (national average was 22.2 per cent); and a significantly lower proportion (41.4 per cent) where English only was spoken at home (national average was 72.7 per cent). The proportion of residents who stated a religious affiliation with Islam was in excess of four times the national average; and the proportion of residents with no religion slightly less than one–third the national average.

Council

Current composition and election method
Liverpool City Council is composed of eleven Councillors, including the Mayor, for a fixed four-year term of office. The Mayor is directly elected while the ten other Councillors are elected proportionally as two separate wards, each electing five Councillors. The most recent election was held on 4 December 2021, and the makeup of the Council, including the Mayor, is as follows:

The current Council, elected in 2021, in order of election by ward, is:

Mayors

History
It is one of the oldest urban settlements in Australia, founded in 1810 as an agricultural centre by Governor Lachlan Macquarie. He named it after Robert Banks Jenkinson, Earl of Liverpool, who was then the Secretary of State for the Colonies and the British city of Liverpool upon which some of the city's architecture is based.

Municipal history

On 19 September 1843, the Liverpool District Council was established by charter, with Captain Samuel Moore as its first magistrate and warden, and Thomas Valentine Blomfield, Thomas Harper, David Johnston, Joshua John Moore, Richard Sadlier and Edward Weston as councillors. Its area also included most of Sutherland Shire. The new form of government was not popular and fizzled out by 1850.

After 148 local residents lodged a petition with the Governor on 4 September 1871, the Municipality of Liverpool was proclaimed on 27 June 1872. At its first election on 27 August 1872, Richard Sadleir was elected Mayor.

On 1 January 1949, the Municipality absorbed Riding B of the abolished Nepean Shire. 

On 9 December 1960, the Municipality was proclaimed by Governor Eric Woodward as the City of Liverpool.

Regional history

Liverpool is at the head of navigation of the Georges River and combined with the Great Southern Railway from Sydney to Melbourne reaching Liverpool in the late 1850s, Liverpool became a major agricultural and transportation centre as the land in the district was very productive. A large army base was established in Liverpool during World War I, and exists to this day as the Holsworthy Barracks. There are a number of other military establishments in neighbouring Moorebank.

Until the 1950s, Liverpool was still a satellite town with an agricultural economy based on poultry farming and market gardening. However the tidal surge of urban sprawl which engulfed the rich flatlands west of Sydney known as the Cumberland Plain soon reached Liverpool, and it became an outer suburb of metropolitan Sydney with a strong working-class presence and manufacturing facilities. Liverpool also became renowned for its vast Housing Commission estates housing thousands of low-income families after the slum clearance and urban renewal programs in inner-city Sydney in the 1960s.

The City of Liverpool is home to one of the largest municipal libraries in Sydney.

See also

List of local government areas in New South Wales
Local government areas of New South Wales

References

External links 
 Liverpool City Council website

 
1872 establishments in Australia
Hume Highway
Liverpool City Council
Georges River
Liverpool